Samay baji (Nepal Bhasa: समय् बजि) is an authentic traditional dish of Newar community in Nepal. In recent years this food has become one of the main attractions of Nepal. It is considered as a typical dish of the Newar community in Nepalese people. This dish has been passed down from many generations and is still much appreciated by the people. There are no specific seasons for this dish to be served but it is mostly served during auspicious occasions, in family get-togethers and Newari festivals. Samay baji is eaten as a starter in every festival, every religious activities and pujas. This is served in Sharada (death anniversary rituals) as well.  It is eaten throughout the year because of its simplicity; it is easy to make and can be stored for a long time. The samay baji is also served during the major festivals of Nepal like Indra Jatra, Dashain, Tihar (Laxmi Puja, Bhai Tika). This dish is served in almost all the activities of Newari people.

Recipe 

Samay Baji consists of many items on a single plate. Among them are chatamari, beaten rice (Chyura), wa: (small pancake made out of black gram paste or mung beans paste), barbecued and marinated buffalo meat (Chhwela), fried boiled egg, black soybeans (Bhatamaas), spicy potato salad (Aalu-Wala), finely cut ginger (known as "Palu"), boiled beans mixed with spices (Bodi ko Achar), green leaves (Saag), and Ayla (an alcohol specific to the Newar Community). Samay baji has achar which is a tangy and spicy medley of different vegetables: mostly radish, carrot, onion, potatoes, and peas, amalgamated with a unique Nepalese berry called lapsi. Recipes vary in each and every household and can include astafoieda, schezuan pepper, black salt, himalayan pink salt, mustard, mustard oil, and a satay of fenugreek seeds with turmeric powder.

Origin 
In Newars there were merchants, priests, goldsmiths, blacksmiths. etc. but a big sections were farmers in the old times. They followed the four seasons of the year which also affected their habits and living style. Back then, there was no electricity or gas like there is now. The source of burning fire were logs of wood. Burning wood is a tedious and time consuming work. Due to this cooking was done two times a day, one in the morning and the other in the evening. Therefore, all the family members would have their meal in the morning before heading out to work in their farm, right after sunrise. There was no concept of breakfast during those times in Nepal. Since Newari people used to stay in a close society, their houses or huts were built next to each other. But, unlike their houses, their farms were quite far. One had to walk an hour on a daily routine just to reach the farm. There were nothing, except for some small shelters, on the way to give them shade in the sun or cover from the rain. Since, they ate their meals early in the morning, they took some snacks as their food to eat during the mid-day. These snacks were made such that, they did not have to be re-heated or re-cooked. That's why foods like ("Chyura"), ("Chhwela"), ("Bhatamaas"), "Palu", ("Saag") and so on were made. These snacks were not only made because of their taste, but for their nutritional advantages as well. For example, "Palu" is good for acidity and gas problems, ("Bhatamaas") reduces the risk of heart diseases, Mustard Oil, used in making ("Chhwela"), helps in killing germs  and ("Saag") is a good source of vitamin.

See also 
 Newa cuisine
 Nepalese cuisine
 Baji (food)
 Flattened rice
 Newa Festival

References 

Nepalese cuisine
Newar culture